Brian LeBarton is a musician from Los Angeles, California.

Notable contributions include his work on Beck's Grammy-nominated 2007 self-released single "Timebomb", the score to Nacho Libre.

Played drums and bass on Beck's cover of Bob Dylan's "Leopard-Skin Pill-Box Hat" for the War Child: Heroes charity album, and was an early member of the Record Club, a project launched for Beck's website in 2010 featuring contributions from Nigel Godrich, MGMT, St. Vincent, The Liars, Thurston Moore and Wilco.

Work
Jamie Lidell : JIM, Musician and writer on "Compass" and "Jamie Lidell" for Warp Records

Contributed music to the film Scott Pilgrim Vs. The World. Credited as "Sex Bob-Omb" bassist and drummer. His recording "Threshold 8-bit", used in the end credits, was sequenced on a Commodore 64 computer.

Musician and writer on Feist's album Metals.

Co-writer and producer on "Fire In The Water" by Feist for The Twilight Saga: Breaking Dawnr – Part 2 film and soundtrack.

engineer on "Manhattan" and "Always On My Own" from the Cat Power album, Sun. Additional engineering on her follow-up album WANDERER

Credited on vocals as "Notrabel" on the track "Streaker" by Tobacco, for his album Ultima II Massage.

References

Living people
American electronic musicians
Year of birth missing (living people)